Deborah Grabien (born June 28, 1954) is an American novelist and essayist. Her works cross several genres, including murder mysteries, supernatural thrillers, utopian fantasies, etc. Her novel Plainsong is a religious fantasy featuring the Wandering Jew and a female Messiah. Grabien is currently a reviewer and guest editor for Green Man Review.

Personal life
She was diagnosed with multiple sclerosis in 2002. She has used her own experiences in dealing with the disease to illuminate character traits in her characters; particularly J.P. Kinkaid, the protagonist in the Kinkaid Chronicles mystery series.

Works

Supernatural thrillers
Still Life With Devils (2007)
Woman of Fire (1988/UK)
also released as Eyes in the Fire (1989/US)

Mysteries
The Kinkaid Chronicles 
Rock and Roll Never Forgets (2008) 
While My Guitar Gently Weeps (2009)
London Calling (2010)
Graceland (2011) 
Book of Days (2011) 
Uncle John's Band (2012) 
Dead Flowers (2012) 
Comfortably Numb (2013) 
The Haunted Ballads
The Weaver and the Factory Maid (2003)
Famous Flower of Serving Men (2004)
Matty Groves (2005)
Cruel Sister (2006)
New Slain Knight (2007)

Historical romance
Fire Queen (1990)

Utopian fantasy
Plainsong (1990)

Young adult
Dark's Tale (2010) 
also released as Dark e i fantasmi del parco (2010/Italy)

Magic realism
And Then Put Out the Light (1993/UK, 2009/US)

Anthologies
Tales From the House Band (editor; 2011)

Short stories, essays and reviews
Chuck Leavell: Back To The Woods: A tribute to the pioneers of blues piano (2012; appeared on Sleeping Hedgehog)
The Thing About Movements… (2011; appeared on Harlot's Sauce) 
Goodnight, dazzling stranger (2011; appeared on Sleeping Hedgehog) 
The Rolling Stones Rock and Roll Circus (2011; appeared on Sleeping Hedgehog) 
Nicky Hopkins (2011; appeared on Sleeping Hedgehog) 
Ladies and Gentlemen: the Rolling Stones (2010; appeared on Sleeping Hedgehog) 
Rolling Stones: Exile on Main Street (2010; appeared on Sleeping Hedgehog) 
Ronnie Penque: Only Road Home (2010; appeared on Sleeping Hedgehog)
Comfort and the Unexpected: In Conversation with Maddy Prior (2010; appeared on Green Man Review'')
An Unkindness of Authors (conversation with Peter S. Beagle, August 2008; appeared on Green Man Review)
Ghost, in the Key of B (2008; appeared on Membra Disjecta)
Dear Richard, Please Will You Play...? Three shows, three settings, one happy woman (2008; appeared on Green Man Review)
Truth, in the Middle (2008; appeared in For Keeps)  
The Boys in the Barroom (2008; appeared on Green Man Review)
Sunrise (2008; appeared on Membra Disjecta)  
Love and Crit and the Whole Damned Thing—Finding the Fulcrum point between heart and head (2008; appeared on Green Man Review) 
Talkin' About that Unbroken Circle—Deborah Grabien on Music in 2007 (2008; appeared on Green Man Review)  
Edge (2005; appeared in Dogtown Review, Issue One)
I Am the Lion (2002; appeared in The Best Of Parisalon4665 Anthology) )

References

External links
 Author's website on Red Room

 Deborah Grabien @ FantasticFiction.co.uk

1954 births
20th-century American novelists
21st-century American novelists
People with multiple sclerosis
American fantasy writers
American mystery writers
American women short story writers
American women novelists
Living people
Women science fiction and fantasy writers
Women mystery writers
20th-century American women writers
21st-century American women writers
Place of birth missing (living people)
20th-century American short story writers
21st-century American short story writers